Events of 2019 in Kuwait.

Incumbents
Emir: Sabah Al-Ahmad Al-Jaber Al-Sabah 
Prime Minister: Jaber Al-Mubarak Al-Hamad Al-Sabah

Events

November 
 14 November – The Prime Minister Sheikh Jaber Al-Mubarak Al-Hamed Al-Sabah tendered resignation of his cabinet to His Highness the Amir Sheikh Sabah Al-Ahmad Al-Jaber Al-Sabah.

December 
 17 December – The formation of the new Kuwaiti cabinet.

References

 
Kuwait